Thanlyin Bridge is a bridge linking the cities of Thanlyin and Yangon in Myanmar. The bridge crosses the 1-km wide Bago river, about 42 km northeast from the river's confluence with Yangon river. The bridge has a single rail track in the middle, surrounded by a motor roadway on each side.

Highway 6 goes over the bridge and connects Yangon with the Thilawa port and Thanlyin Industrial Zone.

The bridge will soon be joined by the Thanlyin Bridge 2, which has been under construction since mid-2000s with assistance from Japan.

History
The bridge was built with Chinese financial and technical assistance. The construction of the bridge began in 1985 but was suspended for about eight months from August 1988 to April 1989 due to unstable political conditions following the uprising of 1988. The total cost of the bridge was Ks.1.65 billion, including a ¥207 million interest free loan from China.

References

Bridges in Myanmar
Buildings and structures in Yangon Region
Bridges completed in 1993
Road-rail bridges